Pavlovskoye is a rural locality (a village) in Sizemskoye Rural Settlement, Sheksninsky District, Vologda Oblast, Russia. The population was 20 as of 2002.

Geography 
Pavlovskoye is located 38 km north of Sheksna (the district's administrative centre) by road. Popovskoye is the nearest rural locality.

References 

Rural localities in Sheksninsky District